A Bit of Fry & Laurie was a British television sketch comedy show, starring and written by Stephen Fry and Hugh Laurie, broadcast by the BBC between 1989 and 1995. Running for four series, it totalled 26 episodes (including a 36-minute special in 1987).

The following is a list of episodes of the programme and the sketches in each one.

Pilot (26 December 1987) 
Customs Camera
Holiday Photographs
Problems around the Eye Area
The Privatisation of the Police Force
Critics ("Argue the Toss", "Up the Arts", "Oh No, Not Another One")
Deodorant - William Wegman from "Selected Video Works 1970-78"
"How Lovely I Was"
Soup/Suit
Mystery (song)
You Can't Make an Omelette without Breaking Eggs (1st Gordon & Stuart)
The word, "Gay"
Toy Car Showroom
Tales of War
Australian Soap Opera

Series one (1989) 
Episode 1 (13 January 1989)
Parent Power
Hugh's Poem
Young People
SAS
The West Indies: A Nation of Cricketers
Spoonbending with Mr Nude
Censored
Haircut
Episode 2 (20 January 1989)
Information
Sound Name (Derek Nippl-e)
Language Conversation (Continued in Series Two's "Beauty and Ideas")
America (song)
Chatshow
Spies One (1st Control & Tony)
Beggar
Hand Exercise
Troubleshooters (1st John & Peter)
Episode 3 (27 January 1989)
Hugh's Brain
Gordon and Stuart Eat Greek (2nd Gordon & Stuart)
Costume Design
Doctor Tobacco
Open University
Spies Two (2nd Control & Tony)
Special Squad
Episode 4 (3 February 1989)
Trouser-Competition Introduction
Prize Poem
Awful Smell (Stole My Sketch 1)
Madness
Antique Shop (Stole My Sketch 2)
Spies Three (3rd Control & Tony)
Light Metal (The Bishop & The Warlord) (song)
Bank Loan
Nipples
Inspector Venice (Stole My Sketch 3)
Tomorrow's World
Episode 5 (10 February 1989)
Lavatories
Critics One
Judge Not
Critics Four
Ignored Teacher
That's It (Silhouettes 1)
Hugh's Favourite Sketch
Critics (heavily edited mixture between Critics Two)
The "Burt"
Christening
Swiss Comedy (Heidi and Johann Smell Just Right)
Episode 6 (17 February 1989)
Marjorie's Fall
Puppy Appeal
Leave It Out (Silhouettes 2)
Girlfriend's Breasts
Spies Four (4th Control & Tony)
Violence
Chicken
Cocoa
Tony of Plymouth (Sword Fight)

Series two (1990) 
Episode 1 (9 March 1990)
Time Where Did You Go (Introduction/Dancercises)
Flushed Grollings
Dammit 1 (2nd John & Peter)
Fast Talker
Grandfather's Things
Psychiatrist
Commentators
Spies/Pulse (5th Control & Tony)
"Michael Jackson" performing Move It On Out Girl
Episode 2 (16 March 1990)
Tideymans Carpets Introduction/The Spillage That Wasn't (Tideymans)
Spies/Pigeons (6th Control & Tony)
Trick or Treat (Tideymans)
Play It Again, Sam
Major Donaldson
Dammit 2 (3rd John & Peter) (Tideymans)
"Improvised" Sketch/First Lines (Tideymans)
Episode 3 (23 March 1990)
Swearing
Witness
Over to You
Jewellry
Hugh's Girlfriends
Mystery Objects
Society
Dammit 4 (4th John & Peter)
Bottom Fondling
Episode 4 (30 March 1990)
"Big" Introduction
Dinner With Digby
Returning suits
Hard Man's Record (1st Alan)
Small Talk
Dammit Lavatories (5th John & Peter)
The Robert Robinsons
Spies/Telescope (7th Control & Tony)
Stephen and Hugh become big/"A Bit of Little & Large"
Episode 5 (6 April 1990)
MBE Introduction
This is Dominic Appleguard
Rhodes Boysons
Amputated Genitals
The Cause (1st Jack & Freddy/Neddy) (3rd Gordon & Stuart) 
Where Eagles Dare
Episode 6 (13 April 1990)
Satire/Tribute ("Where is the Lid?" song)
Yellow Pages
Beauty and Ideas (Continued from Series One's "Language Conversation")
Anarchy
Dammit Church (6th John & Peter)
First Kiss
Borrowing A Fiver Off
Spies/Firing (8th Control & Tony)
Introducing My Grandfather To...
A Vision of Britain
Wrong Directions (follows the end credits)

Series three (1992) 
Episode 1 (9 January 1992)
A Word, Timothy
Very Upset
Love Me Tender (song) (serenading Nicholas Parsons)
Milk Pot
The Department (2nd Alan)
Stephen's Song (song)
Psychiatrists
Cocktail Ending: Whiskey Thunder
Episode 2 (16 January 1992)
Condom Quickie
Embassy
Ampersands
Duel
There Ain't But One Way (Kickin' Ass) Song (song)
Petrol Attendants
Jobs
European Deal
Cocktail Ending 1: A Slow Snog with a Distant Relative
Episode 3 (23 January 1992)
We Haven't Met
Names
The Other Department (3rd Alan)
Hey Jude (song)
The Day I Forgot My Legs
Firing
Question of Sport
Balloon-o!
Shoe Shop (1st Mr Dalliard)
Cocktail Ending: Everything in the Till and No Sudden Moves

The 'Hey Jude' sketch was not included on the Region 1 DVD release due to rights restrictions. The sketch remained intact on the Region 2 DVD, as well as on the streaming services Netflix and BritBox.

Episode 4 (30 January 1992)
Get Well Card
"Photocopying My Genitals With ..."
My Ass
My Ass Critique
News Report
Patriotism
AA
Marmalade
Too Long, Johnny (song)
The Red Hat of Patferrick (1st Gelliant Gutfright)
Cocktail Ending 2: A Mug of Horlicks
Episode 5 (6 February 1992)
Balls
Soup or Broth
Mental Health
World Sport: Bushwallyta
Spaghetti
Aromusician
Countdown to Hell
The New Cause (2nd Jack & Freddy/Neddy)
Neddy PM (3rd Jack & Freddy/Neddy)
Cocktail Ending: Beef Goulash
Episode 6 (13 February 1992)
Magazine Leaflets
My Dear Boy
Joke Shop
Horrormen
Tahitian Kitchen
My Favourite Pants
Devil's Music (The Bishop and the Warlord)
Flying a Light Aircraft with ...
Cocktail Ending: Berliner Credit Sequence

Series four (1995) 
Episode 1 (12 February 1995)

Guests: John Bird, Jane Booker

Sketches:
Grey and Hopeless
Guests Introduction
Blame
Charter
Jane's Poem (NOTE: Script appeared in first script book as Stephen's Poem, but the poem is the same, except the line about his wife dying is changed to Jane's grandfather being murdered.)
Smell
All We Gotta' Do (song; Laurie performed this song when he hosted "Saturday Night Live" in 2006)
Channel Changer
Wonderful Life
Cocktail Ending: Golden Meteorite
Episode 2 (19 February 1995)

Guests: Fiona Gillies, Kevin McNally

Sketches:
Dog Hamper
Hugh's Bandage
Child Abuse
Guests Introduction
Going for Gold
I'm in love with Steffi Graf (song)
Lovers' Helper
Fascion
Avenger
Operational Criteria
Cocktail Ending: Long, Confident Suck
Episode 3 (26 February 1995)

Guests: Imelda Staunton, Clive Mantle

Sketches:
Vox Pops
Guests Introduction
Barman
Interruptus
Little Girl (song)
Making Tea
For Some Reason Angry
Don't Be Dirty
Cocktail Ending: South Seas Vulvic Wart
Episode 4 (5 March 1995)

Guests: Caroline Quentin, Patrick Barlow

Sketches:
Good Evening
Guests Introduction
Football School
Dalliard: Models
Hugh Interviewing Guests
The Polite Rap (song)
Head Gardener
Gelliant Gutfright ("Flowers For Wendy")
Cocktail Ending: A Quick One With You, Stephen
Episode 5 (19 March 1995)
Guests: Phyllida Law, Stephen Moore

Sketches:
Oprah Winfrey
Guests Introduction
Grand Prix
Tribunal
Red and Shiny
Pooch
Disgusting
Wasps
Cocktail Ending: Swinging Ballsack
Episode 6 (26 March 1995)
Stolen Money
Young Tory of the Year
Variety
Gossiping Heads
Death Threat
What I Mind (Misunderstood) (song)
Honda
The Duke of Northampton
Cocktail Ending: Silver Prostate
Episode 7 (2 April 1995)

Guests: Janine Duvitski, Robert Daws

Sketches:
Guests Introduction
Religianto
Consent
Tiny Wife - similar to Father Ted's "small but far away"
Sophisticated Song (song)
Fast Monologue
Telephone Alert
Truancy
Cocktail Ending: A Modern Britain

BBC-related lists
Lists of British comedy television series episodes